Charles Thomas Peacocke CM, (March 31, 1933 – November 2022) was a Canadian actor. He won the Genie Award for Best Actor at the 2nd Genie Awards in 1981, for his role in The Hounds of Notre Dame.

Education 
Born in Lethbridge in 1933, Peacocke grew up in Barons, Alberta and studied acting at the University of Alberta and directing at Carnegie Mellon University.

Career 
Peacocke began teaching drama at the University of Alberta in 1961. His roles have included Fr. MacKinnon in The Bay Boy, Herbert Hoover in The Angel of Pennsylvania Avenue and Dick Collver in Love and Hate: The Story of Colin and JoAnn Thatcher, as well as television roles in North of 60, Street Legal, Chasing Rainbows and Blue Murder.

In 1995 he was appointed to the Order of Canada, Canada's highest civilian honour, for his contributions to Canadian theatre, primarily because of his sustained excellence in producing young actors and playwrights of quality.

Personal life 
He is the father of film and television director T. W. Peacocke. Peacocke died in late November 2022 at the age of 89.

Filmography

Film

Television

References

External links
 

1933 births
2022 deaths
Canadian male film actors
Canadian male television actors
Academic staff of the University of Alberta
Best Actor Genie and Canadian Screen Award winners
Members of the Order of Canada